Booth–Lovelace House, also known as the Overhome Bed and Breakfast, is a historic home located near Hardy, Franklin County, Virginia. It was built in approximately 1859 and is a large, two-story, frame dwelling with weatherboard siding. It has a metal-sheathed hip roof above a bracketed Italianate cornice and three Greek Revival one-story porches. Also on the property are a contributing office / dwelling, ash house, granary, barn, and spring. The house was converted to a bed and breakfast in the 1990s.

It was listed on the National Register of Historic Places in 2002.

References

Bed and breakfasts in Virginia
Houses on the National Register of Historic Places in Virginia
Houses completed in 1859
Greek Revival houses in Virginia
Italianate architecture in Virginia
Houses in Franklin County, Virginia
National Register of Historic Places in Franklin County, Virginia